Gigal (also Romanized as Gīgāl) is a village in Ani Rural District, in the Central District of Germi County, Ardabil Province, Iran. At the 2006 census, its population was 82, in 19 families.

References 

Towns and villages in Germi County